

Yan Zhu is a security engineer, open web standards author, technology speaker, and open source contributor. In 2015 she was recognized as one of Forbes 30 Under 30.

Education 
Yan Zhu is a high school dropout who earned a B.S. in physics at MIT. She enrolled as a National Science Foundation Graduate Research Fellow at Stanford University in experimental cosmology but dropped out after four months.

Employment 
Zhu worked for Yahoo as a security engineer in 2014 and 2015, is a fellow at the Electronic Frontier Foundation, and is currently the chief security officer at Brave Software.

W3C participation 
Zhu is the editor of two W3C documents: the Secure Contexts web standard and End-to-End Encryption and the Web, a W3C TAG finding that supports the  use of end-to-end encryption for web communications. Zhu served on the W3C Technical Architecture Group in 2015.

Other work 
Zhu served on the board of directors of the Zcash Foundation from July 2017 to June 2018 and Noisebridge in 2013.

In July 2018, Zhu interviewed whistleblower Chelsea Manning at the Circle of HOPE conference in New York City.

Zhu has contributed to open source works including:
 Brave
 HTTPS Everywhere
 SecureDrop
 Privacy Badger for Firefox
 Tor Browser Bundle

References

External links 
 Yahoo nomination statement for W3C TAG
 "Mapping the Journey" interview
 Yan Zhu personal web site
 
 Yan Zhu on Quora

Living people
1991 births